Star Spangled to Death is a 2004 experimental film directed by Ken Jacobs, consisting almost entirely of archive footage, depicting Jacobs' view of the United States in film.

Jacobs began compiling material in the late 1950s, and premiered the film (almost seven hours in length) at the 2004 New York Film Festival.

It won the Douglas Edwards Experimental/Independent Film/Video Award at the Los Angeles Film Critics Association Awards 2004.

See also
List of longest films
Jack Smith

References

External links

 Star Spangled to Death at the Film-Makers' Cooperative

Jonathan Rosenbaum review
 Star Spangled to Death on Vimeo

2004 films
American historical films
Films directed by Ken Jacobs
Films set in the United States
Collage film
2000s avant-garde and experimental films
2000s English-language films
2000s American films